is a Japanese manga artist and character designer. He first achieved mainstream recognition for his highly successful manga series Dr. Slump, before going on to create Dragon Ball (his best-known work) and acting as a character designer for several popular video games such as the Dragon Quest series, Chrono Trigger, and Blue Dragon. Toriyama is regarded as one of the authors who changed the history of manga, as his works are highly influential and popular, particularly Dragon Ball, which many manga artists cite as a source of inspiration.

He earned the 1981 Shogakukan Manga Award for best shōnen or shōjo manga with Dr. Slump, and it went on to sell over 35 million copies in Japan. It was adapted into a successful anime series, with a second anime created in 1997, 13 years after the manga ended. His next series, Dragon Ball, would become one of the most popular and successful manga in the world. Having sold 300 million copies worldwide, it is one of the best-selling manga series of all time and is considered to be one of the main reasons for the period when manga circulation was at its highest in the mid-1980s and mid-1990s. Overseas, Dragon Balls anime adaptations have been more successful than the manga and are credited with boosting anime's popularity in the Western world. In 2019, Toriyama was decorated a Chevalier of the French Ordre des Arts et des Lettres for his contributions to the arts.

Early life
Akira Toriyama was born in Nagoya, Aichi, Japan. He drew pictures from a young age, mainly of the animals and vehicles that he was also fond of. He related being blown away after seeing One Hundred and One Dalmatians (1961), and said he was drawn deeper into the world of illustration by hoping to draw pictures that good. He was shocked again in elementary school when he saw the manga collection of a classmate's older brother, and again when he saw a television set for the first time at a neighbor's house. He cited Osamu Tezuka's Astro Boy (1952–1968) as the original source for his interest in manga. Toriyama has recalled that when he was in elementary school all of his classmates drew imitating anime and manga, as a result of not having many forms of entertainment. He believes that he began to advance above everyone else when he started drawing pictures of his friends. Despite being engrossed with manga in elementary school, Toriyama said he took a break from it in middle school, probably because he became more interested in films and TV shows. When asked if he had any formative experiences with tokusatsu entertainment, Toriyama said he enjoyed the Ultraman TV show and Gamera series of kaiju films. 

Toriyama said it was a "no-brainer" that he would attend a high school focused on creative design, but admitted he was more interested in having fun with friends. Although he still did not read much manga, he would draw one himself every once in a while. Despite his parents' strong opposition to it, Toriyama was confident about going into the work force upon graduation instead of continuing his education. He worked at an advertising agency in Nagoya designing posters for three years. Although Toriyama said he adapted to the job quickly, he admitted that he was often late because he is not a morning person and often got reprimanded for dressing casually, until he got sick of the environment and quit.

Career

Early work and Dr. Slump (1978–1983)
Needing money after quitting his job at the age of 23, Toriyama entered the manga industry by submitting a work to an amateur contest in Kodansha's Weekly Shōnen Magazine, which he had randomly picked up in a coffee shop. The timing did not line up for that contest, but another shōnen magazine, Weekly Shōnen Jump, accepted submissions for their Newcomer Award every month. Kazuhiko Torishima, who would become his editor, read and enjoyed Toriyama's manga, but it was not eligible to compete because it was a parody of Star Wars instead of an original work. Torishima sent the artist a telegram and encouraged him to keep drawing and sending him manga. This resulted in Wonder Island, which became Toriyama's first published work when it was published in Weekly Shōnen Jump in 1978. However, it came in last place in the readers survey. Toriyama later said that he had planned to quit manga after getting paid, but because Wonder Island 2 (1978) was also a "flop," his stubbornness would not let him and he continued to draw failed stories for a year; claiming around 500, including the published Today's Highlight Island (1979). He said he learned a lot during this year and even had some fun. When Torishima told him to draw a female lead character, Toriyama hesitantly created 1979's Tomato the Cutesy Gumshoe, which had some success. Feeling encouraged, he decided to draw another female lead and created Dr. Slump.

Dr. Slump, which was serialized in Weekly Shōnen Jump from 1980 to 1984, was a huge success and made Toriyama a household name. It follows the adventures of a perverted professor and his small but super-strong robot Arale. In 1981, Dr. Slump earned Toriyama the Shogakukan Manga Award for best shōnen or shōjo manga series of the year. An anime adaptation began airing that same year, during the prime time Wednesday 19:00 slot on Fuji TV. Adaptations of Toriyama's work would occupy this time slot continuously for 18 years—through Dr. Slumps original run, Dragon Ball and its two sequels, and finally a rebooted Dr. Slump concluding in 1999. By 2008, the Dr. Slump manga had sold over 35 million copies in Japan. 

Although Dr. Slump was popular, Toriyama wanted to end the series within roughly six months of creating it, but Shueisha would only allow him to do so if he agreed to start another serial for them shortly after. So he worked with Torishima on several one-shots for Weekly Shōnen Jump and the monthly Fresh Jump. In 1981, Toriyama was one of ten artists selected to create a 45-page work for Weekly Shōnen Jumps Reader's Choice contest. His manga Pola & Roid took first place. Toriyama was selected to participate in the contest again in 1982 and submitted Mad Matic. His one-shot Pink was published in the December issue of Fresh Jump. Selected to participate in Weekly Shōnen Jumps Reader's Choice contest for a third time, Toriyama had the bad luck of drawing the first slot and had to work over New Year's on 1983's Chobit. Angry that it was unpopular, he decided to try again and created Chobit 2 (1983).

An official Toriyama fan club, was established in 1982. Its newsletters were called Bird Land Press and were sent to members until the club closed in 1987. Toriyama's founded Bird Studio in the early 1980s, which is a play on his name;  meaning "bird". He began employing an assistant, mostly to work on backgrounds.

Dragon Ball and international success (1983–1997) 
Torishima suggested that, as Toriyama enjoyed kung fu films, he should create a kung fu shōnen manga. This led to the two-part Dragon Boy, published in the August and October 1983 issues of Fresh Jump. It follows a boy, adept at martial arts, who escorts a princess on a journey back to her home country. Dragon Boy was well-received and evolved to become the serial Dragon Ball in 1984. But before that, The Adventure of Tongpoo was published in Weekly Shōnen Jumps 52nd issue of 1983 and also contained elements that would be included in Dragon Ball.

Serialized in Weekly Shōnen Jump from 1984 to 1995 and having sold 159.5million tankōbon copies in Japan alone, Dragon Ball is Shueisha's second best-selling manga of all time. It began as an adventure/gag manga but later turned into a martial arts fighting series, considered by many to be the "most influential shōnen manga." Dragon Ball was one of the main reasons for the magazine's circulation hitting a record high of 6.53 million copies (1995). At the series' end, Toriyama said that he asked everyone involved to let him end the manga, so he could "take some new steps in life." During that near-11-year period, he produced 519 chapters that were collected into 42 volumes. Moreover, the success of the manga led to five anime adaptations, several animated movies, numerous video games, and mega-merchandising. Aside from its popularity in Japan, Dragon Ball was successful internationally as well, including Asia, Europe, and the Americas, with 250–300million copies of the manga sold worldwide.

While Toriyama was serializing Dragon Ball weekly, he continued to create the occasional one-shot manga. In 1986, Mr. Ho was published in the 49th issue of Weekly Shōnen Jump. The following year saw publication of Young Master Ken'nosuke, which had a Japanese jidaigeki setting. Toriyama published two Weekly Shōnen Jump one-shots in 1988; The Elder and Little Mamejiro. Karamaru and the Perfect Day followed in issue #13 of 1989.

Also during Dragon Balls serialization, Torishima recruited him to work as character designer for the 1986 role-playing video game Dragon Quest. The artist admitted he was pulled into it without even knowing what an RPG was and that it made his already busy schedule even more hectic, but he was happy to have been a part after enjoying the finished game. Toriyama has continued to work on every installment in the Dragon Quest series. He has also served as the character designer for the Super Famicom RPG Chrono Trigger (1995) and for the fighting games Tobal No. 1 (1996) and Tobal 2 (1997) for the PlayStation.

The September 23, 1988 festival film Kosuke & Rikimaru: The Dragon of Konpei Island marks the first time Toriyama made substantial contributions to an animation. He came up with the original story idea, co-wrote the screenplay with its director Toyoo Ashida, and designed the characters.

Short stories and other projects (1996–2011)
A third anime adaptation based on Dragon Ball, entitled Dragon Ball GT, began airing in 1996, though this was not based on Toriyama's manga directly. Toriyama was still however involved in some overarching elements, including the name of the series and designs for the main cast. Toriyama continued drawing manga in this period, predominantly one-shots and short (100–200-page) pieces, including Cowa! (1997–1998), Kajika (1998), and Sand Land (2000). On December 6, 2002, Toriyama made his only promotional appearance in the United States at the launch of Weekly Shōnen Jumps North American counterpart, Shonen Jump, in New York City. Toriyama's Dragon Ball and Sand Land were published in the magazine in the first issue, which also included an in-depth interview with him.

On March 27, 2005, CQ Motors began selling an electric car designed by Toriyama. The one-person QVOLT is part of the company's Choro-Q series of small electric cars, with only 9 being produced. Toriyama stated that the car took over a year to design, "but due to my genius mini-model construction skills, I finally arrived at the end of what was a very emotional journey."

He worked on a 2006 one-shot called Cross Epoch, in cooperation with One Piece creator Eiichiro Oda. The story is a short crossover that presents characters from both Dragon Ball and One Piece. Toriyama was the character designer and artist for the 2006 Mistwalker Xbox 360 exclusive RPG Blue Dragon, working with Hironobu Sakaguchi and Nobuo Uematsu, both of whom he had previously worked with on Chrono Trigger. At the time, Toriyama felt the 2007 Blue Dragon anime might potentially be his final work in animation.

In 2008, he collaborated with Masakazu Katsura, his good friend and creator of I"s and Zetman, for the Jump SQ one-shot Sachie-chan Good!!. It was later published in North America in the free SJ Alpha Yearbook 2013, which was mailed out to annual subscribers of the digital manga magazine Shonen Jump Alpha in December 2012. The two worked together again in 2009, for the three-chapter one-shot Jiya in Weekly Young Jump.

Toriyama was engaged by 20th Century Fox as a creative consultant on Dragonball Evolution, an American live-action film adaptation of Dragon Ball. He is also credited as an executive producer on the 2009 film, which failed both critically and financially. Toriyama later stated in 2013 that he had felt the script did not "capture the world or the characteristics" of his series and was "bland" and not interesting, so he cautioned them and gave suggestions for changes. But the Hollywood producers did not heed his advice, "And just as I thought, the result was a movie I cannot call Dragon Ball." Avex Trax commissioned Toriyama to draw a portrait of pop singer Ayumi Hamasaki, and it was printed on the CD of her 2009 single "Rule", which was used as the theme song to the film.

Toriyama drew a 2009 manga titled Delicious Island's Mr. U for Anjō's Rural Society Project, a nonprofit environmental organization that teaches the importance of agriculture and nature to young children. They originally asked him to do the illustrations for a pamphlet, but Toriyama liked the project and decided to expand it into a story. It is included in a booklet about environmental awareness that is distributed by the Anjō city government. As part of Weekly Shōnen Jumps "Top of the Super Legend" project, a series of six one-shots by famed Jump artists, Toriyama created Kintoki for its November 15, 2010 issue. He collaborated with Weekly Shōnen Jump to create a video to raise awareness and support for those affected by the 2011 Tōhoku earthquake and tsunami on March 11, 2011.

Return to Dragon Ball (2012–present)
In 2012, Dragon Ball Z: Battle of Gods was announced to be in development, with Toriyama involved in its creation. The film marked the series' first theatrical film in 17 years, and the first time Toriyama had been involved in one as early as the screenwriting stages. The film opened on March 30, 2013. A special "dual ticket" that could be used to see both Battle of Gods and One Piece Film: Z was created with new art by both Toriyama and Eiichiro Oda.

On March 27, the "Akira Toriyama: The World of Dragon Ball" exhibit opened at the Takashimaya department store in Nihonbashi, garnering 72,000 visitors in its first nineteen days. The exhibit was separated into seven areas. The first provided a look at the series' history, the second showed the 400-plus characters from the series, the third displayed Toriyama's manga manuscripts from memorable scenes, the fourth showed special color illustrations, the fifth displayed rare Dragon Ball-related materials, the sixth included design sketches and animation cels from the anime, and the seventh screened Dragon Ball-related videos. It was there until April 15, when it moved to Osaka from April 17 to 23, and ended in Toriyama's native Nagoya from July 27 to September 1.

To celebrate the 45th anniversary of Weekly Shōnen Jump, Toriyama launched a new manga series in its July 13, 2013 issue titled Jaco the Galactic Patrolman. Viz Media began serializing it in English in their digital Weekly Shonen Jump magazine, beginning just two days later. The final chapter reveals that the story is set before the events of Dragon Ball and features some of its characters.

The follow-up film to Battle of Gods, Resurrection 'F', released on April 18, 2015, features even more contributions from Toriyama, who personally wrote its original script. Toriyama provides the basic story outline and some character designs for Dragon Ball Super, which began serialization in V Jump in June 2015 with an anime counterpart following in July. Although the anime ended in 2018, he continues to provide story ideas for the manga while Toyotarou illustrates it. Dragon Ball Super: Broly, released in theaters on December 14, 2018, and Dragon Ball Super: Super Hero, released on June 11, 2022, continued Toriyama's deep involvement with the films.

Personal life
Toriyama married  on May 2, 1982. She is a former manga artist from Nagoya under the pen name , and occasionally helped Toriyama and his assistant on Dr. Slump when they were short on time. They have two children: a son named  born on March 23, 1987, and a daughter born in October 1990. Toriyama lives in his home studio in Kiyosu. He is a well-known recluse, who avoids appearing in public or media.

Toriyama has a love of cars and motorcycles, something he inherited from his father who used to race motorbikes and operated an auto repair business for a brief time, although he does not understand the mechanics himself. The author is an animal lover, having kept many different species of birds, dogs, cats, fish, lizards, and bugs as pets since childhood. Some were used as models for characters he created such as Karin and Beerus. Toriyama has had a lifelong passion for plastic models, and has designed several for the Fine Molds brand. He also collected autographs of famous manga artists, having over 30 including Yudetamago and Hisashi Eguchi, a hobby he gave to the character Peasuke Soramame.

Style 
Toriyama admires Osamu Tezuka's Astro Boy and was impressed by Walt Disney's One Hundred and One Dalmatians, which he remembers for its high-quality animation. He was a fan of Hong Kong martial arts films, especially Bruce Lee films such as Enter the Dragon (1973) and Jackie Chan films such as Drunken Master (1978), which went on to have a large influence on his later work. The artist has also cited the science fiction films Alien (1979) and Galaxy Quest (1999) as influences. Toriyama stated he was influenced by animator Toyoo Ashida and the anime television series adaptation of his own Dragon Ball; from which he learned that separating colors instead of blending them makes the art cleaner and coloring illustrations easier.

It was Toriyama's sound effects in Mysterious Rain Jack that caught the eye of Kazuhiko Torishima, who explained that usually they are written in katakana, but Toriyama used the Roman alphabet which he found refreshing. Torishima has stated that Toriyama aimed to be a gag manga artist because the competitions that he submitted to early on required entries in the gag category to only be 15 pages long, compared to story manga entries which had to be 31. In his opinion, Torishima stated that Toriyama excels in black and white, utilizing black areas, as a result of not having had the money to buy screentone when he started drawing manga. He also described Toriyama as a master of convenience and "sloppy, but in a good way." For instance, in Dragon Ball, destroying scenery in the environment and giving Super Saiyans blond hair were done in order to have less work in drawing and inking. Torishima claimed that Toriyama draws what he finds interesting and is not mindful of what his readers think.

Dr. Slump is mainly a comedy series, filled with puns, toilet humor, and sexual innuendos. But it also contained many science fiction elements: aliens, anthropomorphic characters, time travel, and parodies of works such as Godzilla, Star Wars, and Star Trek. Toriyama also included many real-life people in the series, such as his assistants, wife, and colleagues (such as Masakazu Katsura), but most notably his editor Kazuhiko Torishima as the series' main antagonist, Dr. Mashirito. A running gag in Dr. Slump that utilizes feces has been reported as an inspiration for the Pile of Poo emoji.

When Dragon Ball began, it was loosely based on the classic Chinese novel Journey to the West, with Goku being Sun Wukong and Bulma as Tang Sanzang. It was also inspired by Hong Kong martial arts films, particularly those of Jackie Chan, and was set in a fictional world based on Asia, taking inspiration from several Asian cultures including Japanese, Chinese, Indian, Central Asian, Arabic, and Indonesian cultures. Toriyama continued to use his characteristic comedic style in the beginning, but over the course of serialization this slowly changed, with him turning the series into a "nearly-pure fighting manga" later on. He did not plan out in advance what would happen in the series, instead choosing to draw as he went. This, coupled with him simply forgetting things he had already drawn, caused him to find himself in situations that he had to write himself out of.

Toriyama was commissioned to illustrate the characters and monsters for the first Dragon Quest video game (1986) in order to separate it from other role-playing games of the time. He has since worked on every installment in the series. For each game Yuji Horii first sends rough sketches of the characters with their background information to Toriyama, who then re-draws them. Lastly, Horii approves the finished work. Toriyama explained in 1995 that for video games, because the sprites are so small, as long as they have a distinguishing feature so people can tell which character it is, he can make complex designs without concern of having to reproduce it like he usually would in manga. Besides the character and monster designs, Toriyama also does the games' packaging art and, for Dragon Quest VIII, the boats and ships. In 2016, Toriyama revealed that because of the series' established time period and setting, his artistic options are limited, which makes every iteration harder to design for than the last. The series' Slime character, which has become a mascot for the franchise, is considered to be one of the most recognizable figures in gaming.

Manga critic Jason Thompson declared Toriyama's art influential, saying that his "extremely personal and recognizable style" was a reason for Dragon Ball'''s popularity. He points out that the popular shōnen manga of the late 1980s and early 1990s had "manly" heroes, such as City Hunter and Fist of the North Star, whereas Dragon Ball starred the cartoonish and small Goku, thus starting a trend that Thompson says continues to this day. Toriyama himself said he went against the normal convention that the strongest characters should be the largest in terms of physical size, designing many of the series' most powerful characters with small statures. Thompson concluded his analysis by saying that only Akira Toriyama drew like this at the time and that Dragon Ball is "an action manga drawn by a gag manga artist." However, James S. Yadao, author of The Rough Guide to Manga, points out that an art shift does occur in the series, as the characters gradually "lose the rounded, innocent look that [Toriyama] established in Dr. Slump and gain sharper angles that leap off the page with their energy and intensity."

 Legacy and accolades 

Thompson stated in 2011 that "Dragon Ball is by far the most influential shonen manga of the last 30 years, and today, almost every Shōnen Jump artist lists it as one of their favorites and lifts from it in various ways." David Brothers of ComicsAlliance wrote that: "Like Osamu Tezuka and Jack Kirby before him, Toriyama created a story with his own two hands that seeped deep into the hearts of his readers, creating a love for both the cast and the medium at the same time." In a rare 2013 interview, commenting on Dragon Balls global success, Toriyama admitted, "Frankly, I don't quite understand why it happened. While the manga was being serialized, the only thing I wanted as I kept drawing was to make Japanese boys happy." He had previously stated in 2010, "The truth is, I didn't like being a manga artist very much. It wasn't until relatively recently that I realized it's a wonderful job." Many artists have named Toriyama and Dragon Ball as influences, including One Piece author Eiichiro Oda, Naruto creator Masashi Kishimoto, Fairy Tail and Rave author Hiro Mashima, Boruto: Naruto Next Generations illustrator Mikio Ikemoto, Venus Versus Virus author Atsushi Suzumi, Bleach creator Tite Kubo, Black Cat author Kentaro Yabuki, and Mr. Fullswing author Shinya Suzuki. German comic book artist Hans Steinbach was strongly influenced by Toriyama, and Thai cartoonist Wisut Ponnimit cited Toriyama as one of his favorite cartoonists. Ian Jones-Quartey, a producer of the American animated series Steven Universe, is a fan of both Dragon Ball and Dr. Slump, and uses Toriyama's vehicle designs as reference for his own. He also stated that "We're all big Toriyama fans on [Steven Universe], which kind of shows a bit." French director Pierre Perifel cited Toriyama and Dragon Ball as influences on his DreamWorks Animation film The Bad Guys.

In 2008, Oricon conducted a poll of people's favorite manga artists, with Toriyama coming in second, behind only Nana author Ai Yazawa. However, he was number one among male respondents and among those over 30 years of age. They held a poll on the Mangaka that Changed the History of Manga in 2010, mangaka being the Japanese word for a manga artist. Toriyama came in second, after only Osamu Tezuka, due to his works being highly influential and popular worldwide. Toriyama won the Special 40th Anniversary Festival Award at the 2013 Angoulême International Comics Festival, honoring his years in cartooning. He actually received the most votes for the festival's Grand Prix de la ville d'Angoulême award that year; however, the selection committee chose Willem as the recipient. In a 2014 NTT Docomo poll for the manga artist that best represents Japan, Toriyama came in third place. That same year, entomologist Enio B. Cano named a new species of beetle Ogyges toriyamai after Toriyama, and another Ogyges mutenroshii, after the Dragon Ball character Muten Roshi. Toriyama was decorated a Chevalier or "Knight" of the Ordre des Arts et des Lettres by the French government on May 30, 2019 for his contributions to the arts. He was also a 2019 nominee for entry into the Will Eisner Hall of Fame. Due to his video game design work, IGN named Toriyama number 74 on their list of the Top 100 Game Creators of All Time.

Works

Manga

 Art books 
 
 
 
 
 
 
 
 

Anime
 Dr. Slump – Arale-chan (1981–1986, television series) – original concept, based on his manga Dr. Slump Crusher Joe (1983, film) – designed the MAX 310 space station
 Dragon Ball (1986–1989, television series) – original concept, based on the first half of his manga Dragon Ball  – original concept, script and character designs
 Dragon Quest (1989–1991, television series) – original character designs
 Dragon Ball Z (1989–1996, television series) – original concept, based on the second half of Dragon Ball, title
 Pink: Water Bandit, Rain Bandit (1990, film) – original concept, based on his manga Pink  – original concept, based on his manga of the same name
 Go! Go! Ackman (1994, film) – original concept, based on his manga of the same name
 Imagination Science World Gulliver Boy (1995, television series) – mechanical designs
 Dragon Ball GT (1996–1997, television series) – character designs, title and logo
 Doctor Slump (1997–1999, television series) – original concept, based on Dr. Slump  – based on his manga of the same name
 Blue Dragon (2007–2008, television series) – original character designs
 Dragon Ball: Yo! Son Goku and His Friends Return!! (2008, short film) – original concept, story concept
 Dragon Ball Kai (2009–2011, 2014–2015, television series) – original concept, based on the second half of Dragon Ball.
 Dragon Ball Z: Battle of Gods (2013, film) - original concept, story concept and character designs
 Dragon Ball Z: Resurrection 'F' (2015, film) - original concept, screenplay, character designs and title
 Dragon Ball Super (2015–2018, television series) – original concept, story concepts, character designs and title
 Dragon Ball Super: Broly (2018, film) - original concept, screenplay, character designs
 Dragon Ball Super: Super Hero (2022, film) - original concept, screenplay, character designs

Video games
 Dragon Quest series (1986–present) – character designs
 Dragon Ball: Shenlong no Nazo (1986) – designed several characters including 
 Famicom Jump II: Saikyō no Shichinin (1991) – designed the character 
 Chrono Trigger (1995) – character and setting designs. Alongside Toei Animation, he and his studio also created the animated cutscenes for the 1999 PlayStation port.
 Tobal No. 1 (1996) – character designs
 Tobal 2 (1997) – character designs
 Blue Dragon (2006) – character designs
 Blue Dragon Plus (2008) – character designs
 Blue Dragon: Awakened Shadow (2009) – character designs and voices the character Toripo, which is modeled after his "Toribot" self-insert
 Chōsoku Henkei Gyrozetter (2012) – designed the Beeman 500SS character
 Dragon Ball FighterZ (2018) – designed the character Android 21
 Dragon Ball Legends (2018) – designed the characters  and 
 Jump Force (2019) – designed several original characters
 Dragon Ball Z: Kakarot (2020) – designed the character Bonyū
 Fantasian (2021) – designed a diorama used to create a level

Shueisha
 Weekly Shōnen Jump (1988) – designed the magazine's 20th anniversary character , who later appeared in the video game Famicom Jump: Hero Retsuden V Jump (1990) – designed the magazine's  character, who later appeared in the video games Dragon Quest X (2012), Gaist Crusher (2013), and Monster Strike (2014).
 Weekly Jump F-1 Club (1990) – designed the Weekly Shōnen Jump column's mascot character 
 V-Net (1994) – designed the Weekly Shōnen Jump column's mascot characters  and 
 Souvenirs entomologiques (Jean-Henri Fabre book, 1996) – cover illustrations for the Shueisha Bunko edition of the Japanese translation
 Shueisha (2002) – designed the  character for the 25th anniversary of Shueisha Bunko
  – designed the V Jump column's logo
 Jump Shop (2005) – designed the Weekly Shōnen Jump online shop's  character
 Weekly Shōnen Jump (2009) – designed the magazine's website's  character
 My Jump (2016) – designed the mobile app's  and  characters

Other work

 Fuel Album (George Tokoro album, 1981) – insert illustration
  – album cover
 Polkadot Magic (Mami Koyama album, 1984) – album cover, lyrics to "Crilla" and "Helicopter"
 Higashiyama Zoo and Botanical Gardens (1984) – designed the logo for the zoo's koala exhibit
 Fine Molds (1985) – illustrated the package and instructions for the Lisa model
  – cover illustration
  – character designs
 Fine Molds (1991) – designed the model maker's mascot 
 Super Sense Story (Honda road safety brochure, 1991) – character designs
 Fine Molds (1994) – designed seven of their World Fighter Collection line of models, their packaging and instructions
 Bitch's Life Illustration File (art book, 2001) – illustration
  – wrote and illustrated the book
 QVOLT (electric car, 2005) – designed the automobile
 "Rule/Sparkle" (Ayumi Hamasaki single, 2006) – an illustration of Ayumi Hamasaki as Son Goku printed on the single's CD and DVD
  – an illustration of Chiaki for the cover
 Invade (Jealkb album, 2011) – album cover
 Journey to the West: Conquering the Demons'' (2014) – an illustration of Sun Wukong for a poster for the film's Japanese release

References

Further reading

External links 

 
 
 
 Akira Toriyama's World timeline of works 

 
1955 births
Anime character designers
Chevaliers of the Ordre des Arts et des Lettres
Grand Prix de la ville d'Angoulême winners
Japanese cartoonists
Living people
Manga artists from Aichi Prefecture
Mechanical designers (mecha)
People from Nagoya
People named in the Paradise Papers
Video game artists